Herbert Smith (birth registered third ¼ 1915 – death uncertain) was an English professional rugby league footballer who played in the 1930s and 1940s. Herbert Smith served with army during World War II, in 1944 he was selected for the R.L. Services XV, but was unable to play due to training for the Normandy landings.

Background
Herbert Smith's birth was registered in Dewsbury, West Riding of Yorkshire, England.

Playing career

Challenge Cup Final appearances
Herbert Smith played right-, i.e. number 10, in Bradford Northern's 8-4 victory over Leeds in the 1946–47 Challenge Cup Final during the 1946–47 season at Wembley Stadium, London on Saturday 3 May 1947, in front of a crowd of 77,605.

Club career

Genealogical information

References

External links
Search for "Smith" at rugbyleagueproject.org
Herbert Smith Memory Box Search at archive.castigersheritage.com
Search for "Herbert Smith" at britishnewspaperarchive.co.uk

1915 births
Batley Bulldogs players
Bradford Bulls players
Bramley RLFC players
British Army personnel of World War II
Castleford Tigers players
English rugby league players
Place of death missing
Rugby league centres
Rugby league players from Dewsbury
Rugby league props
Rugby league second-rows
Rugby league wingers
Year of death missing